Ali Aamer (Arabic: علي عامر; born December 26, 1977) is a Bahraini footballer who is a midfielder for Muharraq Club. He is a member of the Bahrain national football team.

External links

References

1977 births
Living people
Bahraini footballers
Al-Muharraq SC players
Footballers at the 2006 Asian Games

Association football midfielders
Asian Games competitors for Bahrain
Bahrain international footballers